The Regroupement QuébecOiseaux Association (formerly the Quebec Association of ornithologists groups) was founded in 1981. This non-profit organization brings together the birdwatchers organizations in Quebec. Its objectives are to "promote the development of bird watching, the study of birds and ensure their protection and their habitats."

Activities 

It allows various affiliated organizations to communicate with each other and provides services that can assist those organizations in their activities. It participates in the development of knowledge about the distribution, ecology and bird conservation by the development and maintenance of databases appointed EPOQ since 1988. It distributes information via a website and QuébecOiseaux magazine launched in 1989.

The Regroupement QuébecOiseaux publicly intervene in cases relating to the protection of birds in Quebec including a species at risk monitoring program.

Board of directors 

 2015 - Chairman: Réal Bisson
 2015 - Vice President: André Desrochers

See also 
eBird
Bird Protection Quebec

External links 
 

Ornithological organizations
Bird conservation organizations
Organizations based in Quebec
Organizations based in Montreal
1981 establishments in Quebec
Animal welfare organizations based in Canada